Typhoon is a 1933 German drama film directed by Robert Wiene and starring Liane Haid, Viktor de Kowa and Valéry Inkijinoff. It was based on the 1911 play Typhoon by the Hungarian writer Melchior Lengyel. It was the last German film made by Wiene, who had been a leading director of German silent cinema.

Synopsis
A Japanese doctor, on a secret mission to Paris for his country, becomes romantically involved with a cabaret singer at a Parisian nightclub. His entire mission is put at risk when he kills a rival for her love, a French journalist and blackmailer.

Production and release
The film was produced by Wiene's own independent production company and shot at the Marienfelde Studios of Terra Film in Berlin. It was made around the time of the changeover from the Weimar Republic to Nazi Germany. In Germany the film was banned for several reasons, particularly what was perceived as the unflattering portrayal of Europeans in contrast to the noble Asian characters. The censors were also concerned that the incompetence of the French justice system would be taken by audiences to mean the German one, undermining their faith in it.

The film had its debut in the Austrian capital Vienna. It was later released heavily re-shot under the alternative title Polizeiakte 909. The new version dramatically altered its plot from the original and the Japanese are now portrayed as unsympathetic villains. The new version was approved by German censors and released in 1934 although its critical reception was poor. It is possible that Wiene, who had left for Budapest in 1933 following the Nazi rise to power, did not personally work on the new version.

Cast
 Liane Haid as Helene Laroche 
 Viktor de Kowa as Charles Renard-Brinski 
 Valéry Inkijinoff as Doctor Nitobe Tokeramo 
 Veit Harlan as Inose Hironari 
 Arthur Bergen as Yoshikawa 
 Paul Mederow as Vorsitzender 
 Bernhard Goetzke as Prosecutor
 Paul Henckels as Defense lawyer
 Josef Dahmen as Werkdetektiv 
 Friedrich Ettel as Kriminalrat Morre

See also
The Typhoon (1914)

References

Bibliography
 Jung, Uli & Schatzberg, Walter. Beyond Caligari: The Films of Robert Wiene. Berghahn Books, 1999.

External links

1933 films
1930s spy drama films
German films based on plays
Films directed by Robert Wiene
Films of the Weimar Republic
Films set in Paris
1930s German-language films
German spy drama films
Terra Film films
German black-and-white films
1933 drama films
1930s German films
Films shot at Terra Studios